Lentzea xinjiangensis is a bacterium from the genus Lentzea which has been isolated from soil in Xinjiang, China.

References

Pseudonocardiales
Bacteria described in 2007